Toystory was a Holstein bull who sired an estimated 500,000 offspring in more than 50 countries around the world. He was owned by Genex Cooperative Inc and he was housed Shawano, Wisconsin. In 2012 Toystory produced a world record-breaking 2 millionth unit of semen at eleven years of age and was the first Holstein bull in history to achieve this mark. Over his lifetime Toystory produced 2.4 million units of semen. Toystory died on Thanksgiving day in 2014 at thirteen years of age.

History 
Toystory was bred by the Wisconsin-based Cooperative Resources International and, was born on May 7, 2001 on Mystic Valley Dairy near Sauk City, Wisconsin. His full name was  Jenny-Lou Marshall Toystory, his dam (mother) was Jenny-Lou Patron Toyanne and his sire (father) was Mara-Thon BW Marshall. Toystory produced his first collected dose of semen in November 2005 and Inimex Genetics started bringing Toystory semen into the United Kingdom in 2006 and started selling the semen in 2007. On June 10, 2009, at just eight years of age Toystory became the youngest Holstein bull ever to produce a million units of semen. Toystory was sold around the world including  North, Central and South America, Europe, Japan, China, Russia, Pakistan were most popular countries. Toystory has sired an estimated 500,000 offspring in more than 50 countries. In May 2011 he became the most productive Holstein ever surpassing the world record by producing his 1.7 millionth unit of semen at just 10 years of age. Just Before his birthday in May 2012, Toystory became the first ever Holstein bull to surpass the 2 million units of semen produced. On Thanksgiving Day 2014 at 13 years of age Toystory died with a lifetime semen production of 2.4 million units of semen produced.

Daughters 
This table contains some of the notable daughters of  Toystory that have sold at auction.

References

2001 animal births
2014 animal deaths
Cattle breeding
History of Wisconsin
Individual bulls
Sauk County, Wisconsin
Shawano County, Wisconsin